"Voltes St Asteria" (Greek: Βόλτες στ' αστερια; English: Rides to the stars) is a song by the Greek Cypriot singer Ivi Adamou from her second album San Ena Oniro, written by Giannis Hristodoulopoulos and Giannis Doxas and produced by Giannis Hristodoulopoulos. It was released on 21 June 2011.

Track listing
Digital download
"Voltes St Asteria" – 3:56

Music video
The teaser of the video clip was released on 5 October 2011. The video clip was fully released few days later on VEVO. However the video is currently unavailable on the channel.

Release history

References 

Songs written by Giannis Doxas
2011 songs
Ivi Adamou songs